The Vijay for Best Stunt Director is given by STAR Vijay as part of its annual Vijay Awards ceremony for Tamil  (Kollywood) films.

The list
Here is a list of the award winners and the films for which they won.

Nominations

2000s
2007 Rambo Rajkumar - Polladhavan
Fefsi Vijayan - Pokkiri
Kanal Kannan - Deepavali
Peter Hein - Sivaji
William Ong - Billa
2008 Rajasekhar (stunt director)|Rajasekhar - Subramaniyapuram
Action Prakash - Anjathey
Kanal Kannan - Bheema
Thyagarajan, Kanal Kannan & Joop Katana - Dasavathaaram
2009 Rajasekhar - Renigunta
Kanal Kannan - Ayan
Kanal Kannan - Vettaikaaran
Super Subbarayan - Naan Kadavul
Fefsi Vijayan - Villu

2010s
2010 Anal Arasu - Naan Mahaan Alla
Anal Arasu - Singam
Peter Hein - Enthiran
Kanal Kannan - Paiyaa
Rambo Rajkumar - Aayirathil Oruvan
 2011 Dhilip Subbarayan - Aaranya Kaandam
 Anal Arasu - Rowthiram
 Peter Hein - 7aam Arivu
 Rajasekhar - Aadukalam
 Stunt Silva - Mankatha
 2012 Anal Arasu - Thadaiyara Thaakka
Kecha Khamphakdee - Thuppakki
Peter Hein - Maattrraan
Rajasekhar - Muppozhudhum Un Karpanaigal
Stunt Silva- 3
 2013 Anal Arasu - Pandiya Naadu
 Anal Arasu, Rocky Rajesh - Singam II
 Billa Jagan - Onaayum Aattukkuttiyum
 Kecha Khamphakdee, Lee Whittaker, Parvez Feroz & T. Ramesh - Vishwaroopam
 Rajasekhar - Ivan Veramathiri
 2014 Supreme Sunder - Goli Soda
Anbariv - Madras
Anal Arasu - Kaththi
Kanal Kannan - Poojai
Stunt Silva - Veeram

See also
 Tamil cinema
 Cinema of India

References

Stunt Director
Stunt awards